The NWA World Junior Heavyweight Championship (Iowa Version) was a professional wrestling championship that was recognized in the Iowa-based National Wrestling Alliance Promotion between 1945 and 1948.
Both the title and the promotion predates the National Wrestling Alliance that was created in 1948 as an actual alliance between wrestling promoters around the midwest which included the founder Paul "Pinkie" George's Iowa NWA Promotion.
At the annual meeting, Billy Goelz, the reigning NWA World Junior Heavyweight Champion in Iowa, was recognized by the new NWA as a sanctioned World Heavyweight Champion alongside Orville Brown who held the Iowa version of the NWA World Heavyweight Champion as well.
As a result, this title was officially retired while Goelz would defend the main NWA title until losing to Leroy McGurik on December 28, 1949 in a unification match for the National Wrestling Association World Junior Heavyweight Championship.

Title History

See also
List of National Wrestling Alliance championships

References 

National Wrestling Alliance championships
World professional wrestling championships
Junior heavyweight wrestling championships
Professional wrestling in Iowa